Toms River is a freshwater river and estuary in New Jersey

Toms River may also refer to:

Communities
Toms River, New Jersey, a township
Toms River CDP, New Jersey, a census-designated place and unincorporated area located within the township

Schools in New Jersey
Toms River Regional Schools, a regional public school district in Toms River, New Jersey
Toms River High School East
Toms River High School North
Toms River Fest, a festival event held on the campus of Toms River High School North
Toms River High School South

Other uses
Toms River Railroad, a defunct New Jersey railroad
Toms River (book), a 2013 nonfiction book by Dan Fagin

See also
South Toms River, New Jersey, a borough in Ocean County
Long Tom River, a tributary of the Willamette River, in western Oregon, USA
Tom River, a river in Russia, right tributary of the Ob
Tom River (Amur Oblast), a river in Russia, left tributary of the Zeya
Toms Creek (Missouri), a creek near Reynolds County, Missouri
Toms Canyon impact crater, at a submarine canyon that is the drowned glacial-age mouth of Toms River off the coast of New Jersey.